Josh Ashton (August 24, 1949 – October 4, 1993) was a professional American football player who played running back for four seasons in the National Football League (NFL) with the New England Patriots and St. Louis Cardinals. He also played one season in the Canadian Football League with the BC Lions in 1971.

References

1949 births
1993 deaths
American football running backs
Blinn Buccaneers football players
New England Patriots players
St. Louis Cardinals (football) players
Tulsa Golden Hurricane football players
People from Eagle Lake, Texas
Players of American football from Texas